Cristián Verón (born July 14, 1979 in El Talar, Argentina) is an Argentine footballer currently playing for Deportes La Serena of the Primera División in Chile.

Teams 
  Platense 1997-2002
  El Porvenir 2002-2003
  Gimnasia y Esgrima de Concepción del Uruguay 2003-2004
  San Martín de San Juan 2004-2006
  Deportes La Serena 2007–2008

See also 
Football in Argentina
List of football clubs in Argentina

References

External links 
 

1979 births
Living people
Argentine footballers
Argentine expatriate footballers
Deportes La Serena footballers
Club Atlético Platense footballers
San Martín de San Juan footballers
Expatriate footballers in Chile
Association footballers not categorized by position